The Brookeborough ministry was  the third Government or Executive Committee of the Privy Council of Northern Ireland. It was led by Basil Brooke (Lord Brookeborough from 1952), who was Prime Minister from 1 May 1943 to 26 March 1963.

The Parliament of Northern Ireland was the home rule legislature created under the Government of Ireland Act 1920. It  existed from 7 June 1921 to 30 March 1972, when it was suspended, and was subsequently abolished under the Northern Ireland Constitution Act 1973.

Cabinet

References

1943 establishments in Northern Ireland
1963 disestablishments in the United Kingdom
Ministries of the Parliament of Northern Ireland
Ministries of Elizabeth II